is a  railway station in the town of Tozawa, Yamagata, Japan, operated by East Japan Railway Company (JR East).

Lines
Tsuya Station is served by the Rikuu West Line, and is located 12.9 rail kilometers from the terminus of the line at Shinjō Station.

Station layout
The station has one side platform, serving a bidirectional single track. The station is unattended.

History
Tsuya Station opened on September 6, 1914. The station was absorbed into the JR East network upon the privatization of JNR on April 1, 1987.

Surrounding area
Confluence of the Mogami River with the Sakegawa River
Tozawa Post Office

See also
 List of railway stations in Japan

References

External links

 JR East Station information 

Stations of East Japan Railway Company
Railway stations in Yamagata Prefecture
Rikuu West Line
Railway stations in Japan opened in 1914
Tozawa, Yamagata